Anjaam Pathiraa is a 2020 Indian Malayalam-language crime thriller film written and directed by Midhun Manuel Thomas. The film stars Kunchacko Boban, Sharaf U Dheen, Sreenath Bhasi, Jinu Joseph and Unnimaya Prasad. Sushin Shyam composed the music, while Shyju Khalid was the cinematographer. The plot follows a squad of police sleuths assisted by a consultant criminologist, Anwar Hussain, as they attempt to unveil the identity of a faceless killer who employs brutal tactics to slay his victims. 

Anjaam Pathiraa was dubbed in Telugu and Hindi as Midnight Murders and Police Story and was released on Aha and Goldmines  Telefilms. The film received positive reviews from critics and audience where it went on to emerge as the highest-grossing Malayalam film of 2020 and was remade in Bengali in 2021 as Mukhosh. Following the film's success, Midhun Manuel Thomas has announced a sequel named Aaaram Pathiraa.

Plot
Anwar Hussain is a psychologist who works as a consulting criminologist in Kochi City Police on the special recommendation of his friend ACP Anil Madhavan. One night, DYSP Abraham Koshi is abducted and his corpse is left in a gypsum field with eyes and heart eviscerated. The investigation is headed by DCP Catherine. The autopsy report shows zolpidem presence in the body, but no signs of coercion. In a few days, a second police officer goes missing, his body is found in the backyard of the police station, along with a Lady Justice figurine. Anwar finds a similar artefact in the previous crime scene from the forensic photos. Autopsy results are the same as previous. The station's CCTV footage has been tampered, indicating the killer is also a security hacker. 

Anwar employs hacker Andrew for cyber investigation. Catherine implements a plan to lure the killer in which two officers should pair and patrol the night at 100-meter distance. During duty, Catherine's driver Paulson is kidnapped. His scooter's camera footage shows a wolf-masked man and another man's voice, indicating they work as a team. Paulson's body is delivered to Anwar's house in a refrigerator box. The fingerprint of a cocaine dealer, Shameer, is found. They track him to a cottage where they find his mummified corpse. It was a decoy. Anwar accidentally discovers a signature imprinted on the figurine, which turns out to be that of its sculptor, Sudhakar Devalokam. On questioning, Sudhakar explains that he made five such figurines for two men, who blinded him after he delivered it. From that, Anwar deduces there will be two more murders.

On another day, CI Sharathchandran is abducted after a struggle at his home, where in addition to the figurine, they also find a fidget spinner. His body is dropped in a Kochi Metro train by a woman. With that, Catherine is replaced with ACP Prakash Seetharam. Sharathchandran had regularly taken a prescription drug named Tenormin. Anwar theorises that the killers inject hypnotic drug Zolpidem in victim's body somehow before kidnapping and hypnotize them for taking away; Tenormin is a counter-drug against Zolpidem, so Sharathchandran's hypnosis was unsuccessful, hence the struggle. Anwar recalls seeing a photo of a similar spinner in the police file for a homicidal psychopath and hacker named Simon. While Simon is recorded dead during an explosion in prison, Anwar is not convinced. Andrew recognises Simon as the one who cross-dressed as the woman on the train. 

Anwar reports his findings but is informed that Simon and his crime partner Aravindan's bodies were found that morning with a suicide note confessing to the murders left along with the last figurine. Anwar is unconvinced and believes it is a decoy to stop the investigation. Anwar is called by Sudhakar after a man comes to his workshop for a sixth figurine. He has made a facial composite. Anwar identifies him as psychologist Dr Benjamin Louis since he always recommends his psychology books for referring when he goes to be a guest lecturer to psychology colleges. From Benjamin's foster parent Sudhevan, Anwar learns that when Benjamin was a teenager, his sister Rebecca was impregnated by a priest named Bennet Franko. When their father Louis reported the crime, SI Anil and Constable Sharathchandran framed him for assaulting his daughter after taking a bribe from Father Bennet. Rebecca was placed in a distant convent, and their father committed suicide in prison. 

Later, Benjamin went to the United States for higher studies and came back. Anwar deduces that the first three murders were random and the actual targets are Sharathchandran and Anil. He goes to warn Anil but finds only his deserted car. From a nearby quadcopter, Anwar finds footage of Benjamin's van, Andrew traces it to a pig farm. Anwar and two officers intercepts Benjamin before he can kill Anil. Benjamin knocks them down and chokes Anwar, but is saved by Catherine and Benjamin is arrested. On questioning, Benjamin does not disclosing his motive. Anwar deduces that the burned corpse misidentified in prison as Simon's was actually Bennet's.  While in transit for presenting him in court, his escort officers kill Benjamin in a fake encounter. At the same time, a woman visits Anil at his apartment. Anwar enters when she leaves and finds Anil dead. Through the window, Anwar calls out the name Rebecca,to which she turns back and looks at him and credits began to roll.

Cast

 Kunchacko Boban as Dr. Anwar Hussain
 Sharaf U Dheen as Dr. Benjamin Louis
 Sreenath Bhasi as Andrew, a hacker
 Jinu Joseph as ACP Anil Madhavan
 Unnimaya Prasad as DCP Catherine Maria
Abhiram Radhakrishnan as SI Pradeep Raman
 Harikrishnan as SI Arun Mathew
 Divya Gopinath as SI Preethi Pothuval
 Remya Nambeesan as Fathima Anwar, Anwar's wife
 Nikhila Vimal as Rebecca Louis (cameo appearance)
 Jaffar Idukki as Louis, Benjamin's and Rebecca's father
 Indrans as Ripper Ravi, a serial killer on death row
 Assim Jamal as Commissioner Hashim IPS
 Shaju Sreedhar as Paulson, Police constable
 Sadiq as Dr. Sreekanth, Surgeon
 Sudheesh as Sudevan
 Priyanandanan as Sudhakar Devalokam
 Nazreen Nazar as Mythili Sudhakar
 Boban Samuel as DySP Abraham Koshy
 Jaise Jose as CI Sarathchandran
 Mathew Thomas as Young Benjamin Louis
 Nandhana Varma as Young Rebecca Louis 
 Sudheer Sufi as Simon Manjooran / Psycho Simon
 Arjun Nandhakumar as ACP Prakash Seetharam IPS
 Arun as Fr. Bennet Franco
 Majeed as Minister
 Zhinz Shan as Jail police officer
 Paul D Joseph as Police Constable
 Preman as Police Constable
 Dileesh Nair as Cocaine Shameer
 Siyona as Samskrithi
 Amina Nijam as Vicky Maria
 Gilu Joseph as Doctor
 Rajan Pootharakkal as Aravindan Kartha
 Santhosh Laxman as Bengali worker

Initially, Actor-writer Vineeth Vasudevan (who co-wrote Allu Ramendran) who is also a chakyar koothu artiste was roped in to play Psycho Simon, but later got replaced.He later plays a small role in the movie.

Production
On 24 June 2019, it was reported that Kunchacko Boban would star in Midhun Manuel Thomas' next directorial and filming was said to begin by late July. Sharaf U Dheen, Unnimaya Prasad, Sreenath Bhasi, Jinu Joseph, Jaffar Idukki and Assim Jamal were also confirmed in the cast, and Sushin Shyam and Shyju Khalid will be the composer and cinematographer, respectively. Midhun said that the film is entirely different from his previous films. The film was formally launched with a pooja ceremony on 17 July 2019. Principal photography began on 1 August 2019, also revealing the title.

Music

The film score is composed, programmed, and arranged by Sushin Shyam.

Release

Theatrical
The film was released on 10 January 2020. The film was passed with 'U/A' certificate from Central Board of Film Certification.

Home media
The film was premiered on 10 April 2020 at 6:30PM in Surya TV and was later released on Sun NXT.

Reception

Critical response

Sajin Shrijith of The New Indian Express rated 4 out of 5 and called it "an efficient, well-crafted mystery" and said that it is "director Midhun Manuel Thomas' best work so far." Litty Simon of Malayala Manorama rated 3.5 out of 5 stars calling it "a crafty thriller from Kunchacko & Co." and "Anjaam Pathiraa will definitely make you restless. It is an excellent theatrical experience. In the film which villain is so complicated and line is multilayered from usual genre which thrills you always." Deepa Soman of The Times of India awarded 3 out of 5 and wrote that it was "a decently engaging crime thriller." and appreciated Kunchacko Boban's performance stating that he "gives the right demeanour to Anwar Hussain, as do the rest of the cast." Writing for The News Minute, Cris called it "a neatly-packed thriller" and added that "the film moves fast, not wasting time on a song or even a line too many, with noticeable performances and negligible flaws." Baradwaj Rangan of Film Companion South wrote "In the end, Anjaam Pathiraa turns out to be one of those films that takes a hot-button issue and expects us to care simply because it takes that issue up. The drama is undernourished, the thrills are feeble".

Box office
The film was both commercial and critical success. In the overseas opening weekend, the film grossed US$713,243 from 78 screens in the United Arab Emirates (the best opening of that weekend), US$48,487 (₹34.48 lakh) from 30 screens in the United States, US$6,081 (₹4.33 lakh) from 2 screens in Canada, and A$28,605 (₹13.89 lakh) from 3 screens in Australia. It earned US$19,857 (₹14.2 lakh) in Canada in two weeks, £28,714 (₹26.78 lakh) in the United Kingdom in three weeks, A$85,285 (₹40.98 lakh) in Australia in four weeks, and US$116,759 (₹83.36 lakh) in the US in five weeks. It is the highest grossing Malayalam film of 2020 which collected over ₹50 crore from Worldwide box office

Remake
The film was remade in Bengali in 2021 as Mukhosh.

Sequel 
A sequel titled Aaram Pathiraa  was announced by Midhun Manuel Thomas on 10 January 2021.

References

External links
 

2020 films
2020s Malayalam-language films
Films scored by Sushin Shyam
Indian crime thriller films
2020 crime thriller films
Films directed by Midhun Manuel Thomas
Indian serial killer films
Fictional portrayals of the Kerala Police
Indian sequel films
Malayalam films remade in other languages
Malayalam films in series
Indian rape and revenge films
Films about rape in India
Indian police films
Films shot in Kerala
Films shot in Kochi